Elections to Salisbury District Council were held on 3 May 2007.  The whole council was up for election, and the Conservatives lost overall control, but were still the largest party winning twenty-two of the fifty-five seats available.

This was the last election of district councillors to take place in Salisbury. The following year, a government review of local government determined that the four district councils of Wiltshire were to be merged with Wiltshire County Council to form a new unitary authority with effect from 1 April 2009, when Salisbury would be abolished and its councillors' term of office would end two years early.

Elections to the new unitary authority, Wiltshire Council, took place in June 2009.

Election result

|}

Electoral division results

Alderbury and Whiteparish

Amesbury East

Amesbury West

Bemerton

Bishopdown

Bulford

Chalke Valley

Donhead

Downton and Redlynch

Durrington

Ebble

Fisherton and Bemerton Village

Fonthill and Nadder

Harnham East

Harnham West

Knoyle

Laverstock

Lower Wylye and Woodford Valley

St Edmund and Milford

St Mark and Stratford

St Martin and Milford

St Paul

Till Valley and Wylye

Tisbury and Fovant

Upper Bourne, Idmiston and Winterbourne

Western and Mere

Wilton

Winterslow

See also
Salisbury District Council elections

References

2007
2007 English local elections
2000s in Wiltshire